The NAC-1 Freelance, originally the BN-3 Nymph, is a British four-seat touring monoplane.

Development
Designed by Desmond Norman when with Britten-Norman, the BN-3 Nymph was an all-metal high-wing braced monoplane powered by a 115 hp Lycoming O-235 engine. It was designed to allow it to be assembled in under-developed countries which would build the aircraft under a technology transfer scheme.

With the demise of the original Britten-Norman company, Norman took the design with him to his new company NDN Aircraft. NDN planned to build and sell the Nymph with a lengthened cabin as the NAC-1 Freelance. The Nymph was reworked as the prototype Freelance and first flew in that configuration on 29 September 1984. In 1985 NDN Aircraft was renamed the Norman Aircraft Company (NAC) and components and fuselage sections for six aircraft were built. Following the failure of the company to win a military order with the NDN Firecracker military trainer the company was closed down.

Specifications (BN-3)

References

External links

 Photo of the sole Norman NAC-2 Freelance 180

1960s British civil utility aircraft
BN-3 Nymph
Freelance
Single-engined tractor aircraft
High-wing aircraft
Aircraft first flown in 1969